Thomas of Galloway (died 1231), (Tomás Mac Uchtraigh), was a Galwegian prince and warrior.

Thomas of Galloway may also refer to:

 Thomas of Galloway (died before 1234), legitimate son of Alan of Galloway
 Thomas of Galloway (bastard) (died after 1286), Tomás mac Ailein, bastard son of Alan of Galloway and claimant to the Galwegian throne